Far Rockaway, Queens is a neighborhood in Queens, New York City. 

Far Rockaway may also refer to:

Far Rockaway Branch, a branch of the Long Island Rail Road
Far Rockaway (LIRR station), a station on the LIRR
Far Rockaway – Mott Avenue (IND Rockaway Line), a New York City Subway station on the 
Far Rockaway High School, a defunct high school

See also
Rockaway Peninsula